Curtis C. Oehme (born June 10, 1877, in Dresden, German Empire) was an American architect based in Billings, Montana.  Several of his works are listed on the National Register of Historic Places.

Works include:
Billings West Side School (1909), 415 Broadwater Ave., Billings, Montana, NRHP-listed
Broadwater Elementary School (1909)
Baker and Lovering Store (1910 reconstruction and facade), Main St., Joliet, Montana, NRHP-listed
Pioneer School (1914), Co. Rd. 1-AG N of Badger Basin, Clark, Wyoming, NRHP-listed
Atlas Block (1915–16), Columbus, Montana, NRHP-listed
County Home Building, Billings, Montana
Wacholz Building (1917), 933 Main, Forsyth, Montana, with Beaux Arts style terra-cotta ornamentation
Alexander Hotel (1917 renovation), 905-925 Main, Forsyth, Montana

References

1877 births
American architects
Architects from Montana
German emigrants to the United States
People from Billings, Montana
Architects from Dresden
Year of death missing